Jameh Mosque of Atigh is a 9th-century mosque in Shiraz, the capital of Fars Province, Iran, Atigh Jameh mosque (Atiq Mosque) the oldest mosque of Shiraz was built in celebration of the conquest of Shiraz by Saffarid Amroleiss in the year 276 AH and was completed in 281 AH. It has been restored many times. The height of the building and its various nocturnal areas (Shabestans) with beautiful tile work on the ceilings, gives a unique charm to this place. It is located in the east of Shah Cheragh Shrine. The entrance door of Shah Cheragh is on the west side of the mosque. undefined Atiq Jame Mosque of Shiraz has been renovated several times. Nodbeh Wall and Khodaye Khane are some of the attractions of this mosque.  Additionally, the dome of the north Iwan and the hypostyle columns are so attracting. In the southern part of this mosque, there is a wall called “Nodbeh”. It differentiates from other walls with a picture of colorful cedar on it. It is believed that on the night of Miraj, Boragh /Buraqpassed from this (Nodbeh) Wall. There is an Iwan and Shabestan. Shabestan is an underground space that can be usually found in the traditional architecture of mosques, houses, and schools in ancient Iran. These spaces were usually used during summers and could be ventilated by windcatchers and qanats. North side is also known as “Imam Gate”. North gate is decorated with Mogharnas tiles.

References

Mosques in Iran
Mosques in Shiraz
9th-century mosques
Mosque buildings with domes
National works of Iran